Jaijaipur Legislative Assembly constituency is one of the 90 Legislative Assembly constituencies of Chhattisgarh state in India.

It is part of Janjgir-Champa district.

Members of the Legislative Assembly

Election results

2018

See also
 List of constituencies of the Chhattisgarh Legislative Assembly
 Janjgir-Champa district

References

Janjgir-Champa district
Assembly constituencies of Chhattisgarh